The Kodak Zi8 is a video camera released by Kodak in 2009. It features 1080p video recording, 5-megapixel still image capture, SDHC card support, and electronic image stabilization.

It became popular with many videographers because of the availability of an external microphone port.

The Zi8 has received mostly positive reviews. CNET gave it an 8.2 out of 10, TechRadar gave it a 4 out of 5, and PC Magazine gave it a 4 out of 5.

References

Kodak cameras